Jitender Kumar  (born 1977) is an Indian boxer who has medaled twice at Commonwealth Games and represented India in both the 2000 and 2004 Olympic Games.

Biography
Jitender Kumar hails from Bhiwani, Haryana. He was trained at Sports Authority of India facility in Bhiwani under coach Jagdish Singh.

Career
Kumar represented India at two consecutive Summer Olympics, starting with the middleweight category in the 2000 Olympic Games. At the 1998 Commonwealth Games he lost to John Pearce in the finals. In the 2002 commonwealth games, he lost to Oscar Williamson in the semi-finals.  In the national circuit, he fought in the heavyweight category as well. He was awarded the Arjuna award in 1999. Kumar qualified for the 2004 Athens Games by ending up in second place at the 1st AIBA Asian 2004 Olympic Qualifying Tournament in Guangzhou, PR China. In the final he lost to South Korea's Song Hak-Seong.

References

Indian male boxers
Middleweight boxers
1977 births
Living people
Commonwealth Games silver medallists for India
Commonwealth Games bronze medallists for India
Olympic boxers of India
Boxers at the 1998 Commonwealth Games
Boxers at the 2000 Summer Olympics
Boxers at the 2002 Commonwealth Games
Boxers at the 2004 Summer Olympics
Recipients of the Arjuna Award
Boxers at the 1998 Asian Games
Boxers at the 2002 Asian Games
Commonwealth Games medallists in boxing
Boxers from Haryana
Asian Games competitors for India
Medallists at the 1998 Commonwealth Games
Medallists at the 2002 Commonwealth Games